Micropterix igaloensis is a species of moth belonging to the family Micropterigidae. It was described by Hans Georg Amsel in 1951 and is only known from Montenegro.

The length of the forewings is about 4 mm.

References

Micropterigidae
Moths described in 1951
Endemic arthropods of Montenegro
Taxa named by Hans Georg Amsel